The Clinton Herald is a six-day (Monday through Saturday) daily newspaper published in Clinton, Iowa, and covering Clinton and Jackson counties in Iowa, and Carroll and Whiteside counties in Illinois.

Overview
It is owned by Community Newspaper Holdings Inc.  The paper was founded in 1855 by the publisher Charles E. Leonard, the husband of suffragist Cynthia Leonard and father of Lillian Russell.

The newspaper's marketing slogans include "News About You!" and "Where It's At!"

References

External links
 Clinton Herald Website
 CNHI Website

Clinton Herald
Clinton Herald
1856 establishments in Iowa
Publications established in 1856